Matelda (d. after 1117) was the Dogaressa of Venice by-marriage to the Doge Ordelafo Faliero (r. 1102-1117).

She is said to have been the cousin or sister of King Baldwin I of Jerusalem. Matelda has traditionally been described as an ideal of spousal fidelity. During her time as Dogaressa, Venice was struck by several natural disasters, and during those, Matelda led the women of Venice in prayer to soften the perceived wrath of God.   In 1117, she warned Ordelafo to not wage war on Byzantium claiming that his duty was to his people in the time of crisis.   After the Zara campaign, wherein the Doge was killed, she received the religious artifacts taken as war prizes from when they were brought to Venice, and installed them in San Maggiore. After this, she joined the convent of San Zaccaria.

References 
 Staley, Edgcumbe:  The dogaressas of Venice : The wives of the doges, London : T. W. Laurie

12th-century Venetian people
Dogaressas of Venice
12th-century Venetian women